Laconic speech may mean:
 alogia - a thought impoverishment observable through speech and language use
 laconic phrase - a concise or terse statement, especially a blunt and elliptical rejoinder